Diljott is a Film Actress. She won attention for her lead roles in films like Khatre Da Ghuggu, Teshan, Yaar Annmulle 2, and 5 Weddings and songs 'Matwaliye', 'Patiala Peg', 'Diamond Koka', 'Pehli Mulaqat', 'Dard Ishq Hai', 'Will Forget','Wang Golden'. Her released singles include "Just Love You", “Tere Rang”, Akh Mataka" and "Maa Meri."

Early life 
Diljott is a Punjabi and is born to a family of academicians. She has studied Public Policy from Harvard University, USA. She has also studied International Development from University of British Columbia, Canada. She earned her Master's degree in Human Rights and Duties from Panjab University, Chandigarh and topped in the university during Masters and was honored with a University Gold Medal. Diljott is also a University Gold medalist for standing first in the University in Graduation, Bachelor of Arts (Majors in Psychology), Panjab University, Chandigarh. Twice being a University Gold Medalist, she also did her post graduate course in NGO Management from Amity University and completed a Project Cycle Management Course from NGO Management School at Geneva, Switzerland. Additionally, she has a Certificate Course in Computer and Information Technology and did her schooling from Delhi Public School, Chandigarh.

She is active in sports and believes in a fit and a healthy lifestyle. Diljott is also an avid reader  and her motivational video series 'Monday's with Diljott- Dil Ki Baat' on her social media platforms inspires the youth to be a better human being.

Career

Diljott is a trained actor from a Mumbai acting institute and is a Kathak, western, and folk dancer. After working with photographer Dabboo Ratanani, she featured in advertisements for clothing brands and magazine covers including Hindustan Petroleum Corporation Limited, Larsen and Toubro.

She is fluent in English, Punjabi and Hindi and works in Bollywood and Punjabi cinema as a lead actress.

Diljott featured in the song "Matwaliye' opposite Satinder Sartaaj which is her much appreciated performance. Her performance in recently released song ‘Diamond Koka’ opposite Gurnam Bhullar is getting a special mention and huge applause from all over the world. Another song "Patiala Peg" opposite Diljit Dosanjh, is also a hit track., "Munda Grewala Da" opposite Gippy Grewal,"Pehli Mulaqat" opposite Gurnam Bhullar, "Dard Ishq Hai'- a popular bollywood track, "Will Forget"opposite  Parmish Verma, "Wang Golden" opposite Sajjan Adeeb. Diljott's films as a lead actress in Teshan (2016) and Yaar Annmulle 2 (2017) were hits. She appeared Hollywood film 5 Weddings (2018). She starred as a lead actress in Khatre Da Ghuggu (2020).

Her single "Tere Rang" (2017)., this song was used as a playback song for 5 Weddings. Another single was "Akh Mataka" (2017). Diljott performed at the 2016 Virasat International Punjabi Film Festival and Awards. Her song "Maa Meri" (2017) is an ode to mothers. "Just Love You" (2018) was a romantic song.

Filmography

Videos

Songs

Awards and recognition

Philanthropy
Diljott is the founder of Dream Buds Foundation. It is a Registered Trust to encourage and support the underprivileged who have been unable to realise and fulfil their dreams and potentials because of lack of resources, environment, support, guidance, impoverished conditions or circumstances by providing them with opportunities, resources, awareness and guidance to fulfil and nurture their dreams and add a meaning to their lives. The tagline of the Foundation is ‘Every one can Dream’ irrespective of where they are born, where they come from, whosoever they are, of whichever age or gender they are, even the underprivileged have a full right to dream and pursue their passions.

References

External links
 Diljott Facebook
 Diljott Instagram
 Diljott Twitter
 Diljott Website
 Diljott Snapchat
 You Tube Channel
 

Year of birth missing (living people)
Living people
21st-century Indian actresses
Punjabi people
Indian film actresses
Actresses in Punjabi cinema
Indian women philanthropists
Indian philanthropists
Actresses from Punjab, India